Half-ration Névé is a large névé at the head of Aviator Glacier in Victoria Land, Antarctica. It is largely enclosed on the west side by the Mesa Range. It was so named by the northern party of the New Zealand Geological Survey Antarctic Expedition, 1962–63, because its resupply was delayed several days by blizzards and the party was limited to reduced rations.

References

Snow fields of Victoria Land
Borchgrevink Coast
Névés of Antarctica